A Debt Discharged is a 1916 thriller novel by Edgar Wallace. An American investigator goes in pursuit of a gang forging money on a large scale.

Film adaptation
In 1961, it was turned into the film Man Detained; it was directed by Robert Tronson as part of a long-running series of Wallace films made at Merton Park Studios.

References

Bibliography
 Goble, Alan. The Complete Index to Literary Sources in Film. Walter de Gruyter, 1999.

1916 British novels
Novels by Edgar Wallace
British thriller novels
British novels adapted into films